The list of ship launches in 1890 includes a chronological list of some ships launched in 1890.

References

Sources

1890
 
1890 in transport